Federico Palmieri (born 1 July 1995) is an Italian football player. He plays for U.S.D. Recanatese 1923 in the Serie D.

Club career
He made his Serie C debut for Santarcangelo on 8 November 2014 in a game against Ancona.

References

External links
 
 

1995 births
People from Recanati
Living people
Italian footballers
A.C. Carpi players
Santarcangelo Calcio players
S.S. Maceratese 1922 players
Serie B players
Serie C players
Serie D players
Association football forwards
Sportspeople from the Province of Macerata
Footballers from Marche